Ellen R. Cohn is an associate dean and associate professor at University of Pittsburgh School of Health and Rehabilitation Sciences, with a secondary faculty appointment at University of Pittsburgh School of Pharmacy. She is a faculty member of the McGowan Institute of Regenerative Medicine.

She received a BA from Douglass College of Rutgers University in 1974, an MS from Vanderbilt University in 1975 and a PhD from University of Pittsburgh in 1980.

Her research interests are in the areas of cleft palate, dentofacial and craniofacial disorders; clinical training in speech-language pathology; pharmacy-based and small group communication; and instructional and telerehabilitation based applications of electronic communication. She has done substantial work in supervision of clinicians who deliver speech-language therapy, and in website content development, including websites that seek to engage an international audience.

She has authored multiple distance education manuals, and co-authored Videofluroscopic Studies of Speech in Patients with Cleft Palate with radiologist M. Leon Skolnick. Cohn is a member of numerous professional organizations, including the American Speech-Language-Hearing Association and the American Cleft Palate-Craniofacial Association. She has also contributed to: Educause Quarterly, IT Practitioners Journal, The Cleft Palate-Craniofacial Journal, Plastic and Reconstructive Surgery, The Journal of Speech-Language and Hearing Disorders, and Radiology. Cohn is the founding editor of the International Journal of Telerehabilitation, a peer-reviewed open access journal published by the University Library System, University of Pittsburgh.  Cohn is currently the chair of the Telerehabilitation Special Interest Group of the American Telemedicine Association.

Selected publications
 Cohn, E, Klinzing. G, Frieze, IH, Sereika. S, Stone, CA, and Vana C, Academic Computing Vulnerabilities: Another View of the Roof, Educause Quarterly, 1: 57- 61, 2004. https://web.archive.org/web/20060612004004/http://www.educause.edu/apps/eq/eqm04/eqm0419.asp
 Cohn E. and Hibbitts, B. Beyond the Electronic Portfolio: A Lifetime Personal Web Space, Educause Quarterly, 27:4, 7-10, Nov. 2004. https://web.archive.org/web/20060526003720/http://www.educause.edu/apps/eq/eqm04/eqm0441.asp
 Cohn, E, One Course, One Website—Of Course? Educause Quarterly, 2, 2004.http://www.educause.edu/apps/eq/eqm04/eqm0421.asp
 Cohn, E. Introduction of Computing Competencies for Future Healthcare Professionals, Editor: Dave Brown, In: Teaching With Technology: Sixty Professors From Eight Universities Tell Their Stories, Anker, NH: Anker Publishing Co., 2000.
 Cohn, E, and Stoehr. G. Multidisciplinary Applications of CourseInfo Course Management Software to Motivate Students in Traditional Course Settings, Interactive Multimedia Electronic Journal of Computer-Enhanced Learning, 2:1, http://imej.wfu.edu/articles/2000/1/04/index.asp April 2000,
 Skolnick, ML and Cohn, ER, Videofluoroscopic Studies of Speech in Patients With Cleft Palate. New York: Springer-Verlag, 1989.
 Cohn ER, Rood, SR, McWilliams BJ, Skolnick, ML, and Abdelmalek, LR, Barium sulphate coating of the nasopharynyx in lateral view videofluoroscopy. Cleft Palate Journal, 21:7,-17, 1984.
 Glaser, ER, (now ER Cohn) Garver, KL, Metz, MC, McWilliams, BJ, Skolnick, ML and Garrett, WS, Velopharyngeal incompetence in a patient with multifocal eosinophilic granuloma, (Hand-Schuller-Christian Disease), Journal of Speech-Language and Hearing Disorders, 47:320-323, 1982.
 McWilliams, BJ, Glaser, ER, (now ER Cohn) Philips, BJ, Lawrence, C, Lavorato, AS, Beery, QC, and Skolnick, ML. A comparative study of four methods of evaluating velopharyngeal adequacy. Plastic and Reconstructive Surgery, 68:1-9, July 1981.
 Skolnick, ML, Glaser, ER (now ER Cohn) and McWilliams, BJ, The uses and limitations of the barium swallow in the detection of velopharyngeal insufficiency, Radiology, 135:301-304, May 1980.

References

External links
 Webpage at UPSHRS

American scientists
Living people
University of Pittsburgh faculty
Rutgers University alumni
Vanderbilt University alumni
University of Pittsburgh alumni
Year of birth missing (living people)